The Ruhstaller Building, listed on the National Register of Historic Places, is a historic building located in the heart of Downtown Sacramento, California, USA.

History 
Built in 1898, the  building was built by the behest of Frank Ruhstaller and housed The Ruhstaller Brewery offices. Ruhstaller also managed Buffalo Brewery and made the building its headquarters as well. One of the new technologies the building featured was air conditioning that functioned with water pumped in from the Sacramento River.

Multiple rehab projects have been completed on the building over the years, the most recent of which was in 2004. The project focused on, among other things, renovating the third and fourth floors that had been vacant for some time.

See also
History of Sacramento, California
California Historical Landmarks in Sacramento County, California
National Register of Historic Places listings in Sacramento County, California

References

Brewery buildings in the United States
Buildings and structures in Sacramento, California
Office buildings completed in 1898
Commercial buildings on the National Register of Historic Places in California
National Register of Historic Places in Sacramento, California
History of Sacramento, California
Queen Anne architecture in California
Romanesque Revival architecture in California
Victorian architecture in California
1898 establishments in California